Bluff City is a city in Sullivan County, Tennessee, United States. The population was 1,733 at the 2010 census. It is part of the Kingsport–Bristol (TN)–Bristol (VA) Metropolitan Statistical Area, which is a component of the Johnson City–Kingsport–Bristol, TN-VA Combined Statistical Area – commonly known as the "Tri-Cities" region.

History
Bluff City underwent several name changes before incorporating on July 1, 1887 under its present name. The town was originally known as Choate's Ford, and later took the name Middletown. After the East Tennessee, Virginia and Georgia Railroad was built, crossing the Holston River at the town site, the name Union was adopted. During the Civil War it was called Zollicoffer after Confederate General Felix Zollicoffer, but became Union again at the end of the war and until 1887.

Geography
Bluff City is located at  (36.463352, -82.275049).

Demographics

2020 census

As of the 2020 United States census, there were 1,822 people, 842 households, and 541 families residing in the city.

2000 census
As of the census of 2000, there were 1,559 people, 662 households, and 450 families residing in the city. The population density was 1,029.2 people per square mile (398.6/km2). There were 728 housing units at an average density of 480.6 per square mile (186.1/km2). The racial makeup of the city was 98.52% White, 0.19% African American, 0.13% Native American, 0.58% Asian, and 0.58% from two or more races. Hispanic or Latino of any race were 0.71% of the population.

There were 662 households, out of which 29.2% had children under the age of 18 living with them, 52.6% were married couples living together, 11.3% had a female householder with no husband present, and 31.9% were non-families. 28.2% of all households were made up of individuals, and 11.0% had someone living alone who was 65 years of age or older. The average household size was 2.35 and the average family size was 2.84.

In the city, the population was spread out, with 23.0% under the age of 18, 9.0% from 18 to 24, 33.2% from 25 to 44, 22.8% from 45 to 64, and 11.9% who were 65 years of age or older. The median age was 35 years. For every 100 females, there were 91.1 males. For every 100 females age 18 and over, there were 86.3 males.

The median income for a household in the city was $31,587, and the median income for a family was $36,938. Males had a median income of $26,422 versus $19,957 for females. The per capita income for the city was $14,175. About 11.0% of families and 14.7% of the population were below the poverty line, including 26.3% of those under age 18 and 9.3% of those age 65 or over.

Climate
The climate in this area has mild differences between highs and lows, and there is adequate rainfall year-round.  According to the Köppen Climate Classification system, Bluff City has a marine west coast climate, abbreviated "Cfb" on climate maps.

Police department
The town has a police department. On January 1, 2010 the department installed a speed camera on US Highway 11E that reportedly issued 1,662 tickets in its first six months. The town splits the revenue with the operator of the camera. In 2014, the town expected to gain less than $100,000 from the cameras. However the town's budget for FY 2017 reports expected "Speed Cameras" revenue of $600,000. This represents the largest single income line item for the city at 35% of total operating revenue.

In 2010, Gray, Tennessee resident Brian McCrary bought the former police department website after police failed to renew it.  He used it to post information about fighting camera tickets.  Police, lacking education on website matters, assumed they had been hacked.  Negotiations to regain control of the domain name were unsuccessful.

References

External links
Official site
City charter

Cities in Tennessee
Cities in Sullivan County, Tennessee
Kingsport–Bristol metropolitan area
Populated places established in 1887